Claunch is an unincorporated community in Socorro County, New Mexico, United States. Claunch is located on New Mexico State Road 55 in the easternmost region of Socorro County. Claunch has a post office with ZIP code 87011.

History
A post office has been in operation at Claunch since 1930. The community was named for L. H. Claunch, a cattleman.

References

Unincorporated communities in Socorro County, New Mexico
Unincorporated communities in New Mexico